Usolye-Sibirskoye is a town in Irkutsk Oblast, Russia, located on the left bank of the Angara River. Population:

History
It was founded in 1669 under the name Usolye, an archaic Russian word for a salt producing town, by the Mikhalevs brothers, Cossacks who had discovered salt deposits in a nearby spring.

The Siberian Route was built through the town in the 18th century, followed in the late 19th century by the Trans-Siberian Railway.

Town status was granted to it in 1925. The town's name was given the extension Sibirskoye (Siberian) in 1940, to differentiate from the town of Usolye in the Kama River region.

From 1947 until 1953, the town hosted a prison camp of the gulag system.

Administrative and municipal status
Within the framework of administrative divisions, it is incorporated separately as the Town of Usolye-Sibirskoye—an administrative unit with the status equal to that of the districts. As a municipal division, the Town of Usolye-Sibirskoye is incorporated as Usolye-Sibirskoye Urban Okrug.

Until November 2016, Usolye-Sibirskoye served as the administrative center of Usolsky District, even though it was not a part of it.

Economy and infrastructure
Ever since its inception, the main industry of the town has been salt-mining. With the opening of a major mine in 1956, the town became Russia's largest producer of table salt. Related chemical industries such as Usolyekhimprom were also developed.

There is also assembly plant for heavy machinery, including mining equipment produced by the company Usolyemash.

The town has a station on the Trans-Siberian Railway, and is located on the highway from Novosibirsk to Irkutsk.

A tram network has operated since the 1960s, originally funded by the salt mine.

Climate
Usolye-Sibirskoye has a dry-winter subarctic climate (Köppen climate classification: Dwc).

Gallery

References

Notes

Sources

External links
Official website of Usolye-Sibirskoye
Transsib.ru. Entry on Usolye-Sibirskoye

Cities and towns in Irkutsk Oblast
Populated places established in 1669
1669 establishments in Russia